Edward Wall (August 16, 1903 – July 4, 1960) was an American Negro league pitcher in the 1920s.

A native of St. Louis, Missouri, Wall played for the Cleveland Elites in 1926. In eight recorded games, he posted one hit in eight plate appearances. Wall died in St. Louis in 1960 at age 56.

References

External links
 and Seamheads

1903 births
1960 deaths
Cleveland Elites players
Baseball pitchers
Baseball players from St. Louis
20th-century African-American sportspeople